Peter may refer to:

People
 List of people named Peter, a list of people and fictional characters with the given name
 Peter (given name)
 Saint Peter (died 60s), apostle of Jesus, leader of the early Christian Church
 Peter (surname), a surname (including a list of people with the name)

Culture
 Peter (actor) (born 1952), stage name Shinnosuke Ikehata, Japanese dancer and actor
 Peter (album), a 1993 EP by Canadian band Eric's Trip
 Peter (1934 film), a 1934 film directed by Henry Koster
Peter (2021 film), Marathi language film 
 "Peter" (Fringe episode), an episode of the television series Fringe
 Peter (novel), a 1908 book by Francis Hopkinson Smith
 "Peter" (short story), an 1892 short story by Willa Cather

Animals
 Peter, the Lord's cat, cat at Lord's Cricket Ground in London
 Peter (chief mouser), Chief Mouser between 1929 and 1946
 Peter II (cat), Chief Mouser between 1946 and 1947
 Peter III (cat), Chief Mouser between 1947 and 1964
 Pete the Cat, fictional cartoon cat
 Peter (dog), a collie awarded the Dickin Medal in 1945
 Peter (eagle), a bald eagle at the Philadelphia Mint c. 1830–36

Other uses

 The Peter, or Peter Pomegranate, a 16th-century English warship
 Peter, Utah or Petersboro, a census-designated place (CDP) in Cache County, Utah, United States
 Act of Peter, a 5th-century miracle text
 Acts of Peter, one of the apocryphal Acts of the Apostles
 Gospel of Peter, a non-canonical gospel
 Tropical Storm Peter, various storms named Peter

See also

 , including many people with forename Peter
 
 Epistle of Peter (disambiguation)
 King Peter (disambiguation)
 Pete (disambiguation)
 Peters (disambiguation)
 Pierre (disambiguation)
 Piter (disambiguation)
 Petrus (disambiguation)
 Petre, a surname and given name
 Petro (disambiguation)
 Petru, a Romanian name meaning Peter, including a list of people with the name
 Petteri, a Finnish name meaning Peter, including a list of people with the name
 Saint Peter (disambiguation)